Ilija Martinović (born 31 January 1994) is a Montenegrin footballer who plays as a defender for Bosnian club Sarajevo.

Club career
In June 2020, Martinović signed a three-year contract with Slovenian PrvaLiga side Maribor. He left the club in January 2022 after his contract was mutually terminated. In the same month, he signed a contract with the Ukrainian Premier League team Chornomorets Odesa. However, he left Ukraine just a month later when the war in Ukraine broke out, and joined his homeland team Dečić on loan. In January 2023, Martinović signed a two-and-a-half year contract with Premier League of BH side Sarajevo.

International career
Martinović made one appearance for the Montenegro under-21 team in March 2015. He made his debut for the senior team on 27 March 2021 in a World Cup qualifier against Gibraltar.

Career statistics

International

References

External links
 
 

1994 births
Living people
Sportspeople from Cetinje
Association football defenders
Montenegrin footballers
Montenegro under-21 international footballers
Montenegro international footballers
FK Lovćen players
FK Cetinje players
NK Aluminij players
NK Maribor players
FC Chornomorets Odesa players
FK Dečić players
Pakhtakor Tashkent FK players
FK Sarajevo players
Montenegrin First League players
Slovenian PrvaLiga players
Uzbekistan Super League players
Premier League of Bosnia and Herzegovina players
Montenegrin expatriate footballers
Expatriate footballers in Slovenia
Montenegrin expatriate sportspeople in Slovenia
Expatriate footballers in Ukraine
Montenegrin expatriate sportspeople in Ukraine
Expatriate footballers in Uzbekistan
Montenegrin expatriate sportspeople in Uzbekistan
Expatriate footballers in Bosnia and Herzegovina
Montenegrin expatriate sportspeople in Bosnia and Herzegovina